Steve Schale is a political strategist in Florida. He was the State Director for the Barack Obama campaign in Florida, managing Obama's 2008 effort in the state, and served as a Florida Senior Advisor in 2012.

Born in Kankakee, Illinois, Schale is a graduate of the University of the South in Sewanee, Tennessee, where he received degrees in political science and history. He got his political start in 1996, managing the state house campaign of Doug Wiles of St. Augustine. Wiles, who for several terms represented the most Republican seat held by a Democrat, went on to become the Minority Leader of the state house in Florida, where Schale joined him as his communications director.

In 2005, Schale left the legislature to take over the political operations of the State House Democratic Caucus, where under his leadership and working with former state senator Dan Gelber, the Democrats had their best two-year election cycle in history, picking up nine districts previously held by Republicans, for which Schale was called the "newest star of the Florida Democratic Party" by the St. Petersburg Times, and "Wunderkind" by the National Journal.

In June 2008, Schale was hired by Obama for America to run the Tampa-based Florida operation, helping Senator Obama become the first non-incumbent Democrat to win Florida since President Jimmy Carter's win in 1976, leading an effort that the Miami Herald said will "change the way politics is practiced in Florida." In winning Florida, Obama carried most of the critical swing counties in central Florida and registered hundreds of thousands of new voters.  Today, Schale is considered one of the top strategists in either party in Florida.

Following the two Obama campaigns, Schale returned to Tallahassee, where he married Nikole Souder-Schale, a regional vice president with the American Heart Association. In Florida, he advised Alex Sink's campaign for governor in 2010, as well as Gwen Graham's successful Congressional campaign in 2014.  In 2015, he helped the operations of Draft Biden, the Super PAC supporting a potential presidential bid by Obama's vice president, Joe Biden.  Today, he runs his own company, advising companies such as Walt Disney World and AT&T on Florida, as well as working with a number of candidates.

In 2014, Schale won the KIE NASCAR league Championship which is often displayed behind him when he appears on television.

External links
St. Petersburg Times:  What happened to the circular firing squad? 
St. Petersburg Times: A savvy strategist who's getting Democrats elected 
National Journal:  Whose to Lose? March 29. 2008
Miami Herald: Schale leads Obama's state campaign (Link to St. Augustine Record): 
St. Peterburg Times: Obama campaign signs a winning Florida strategist 
Miami Herald: How Obama won Florida.

References

Living people
American political consultants
People from Kankakee, Illinois
Year of birth missing (living people)